Maksim Kartashov is a Kazakh journalist; a sports correspondent of Vremya weekly, chief editor of Hokkey Kazakhstana and a contributor to Express-K. 

In August 2012, he was assaulted in Almaty at his flat.

References

Kazakhstani journalists
Living people
Sports journalists
Year of birth missing (living people)